Kopli may refer to several places in Estonia:

Kopli, subdistrict of Tallinn
Kopli, Rae Parish, village in Rae Parish, Harju County
Kopli, Ida-Viru County, village in Lüganuse Parish, Ida-Viru County
Kopli, Saare County, village in Leisi Parish, Saare County